"Believe" is a song by American musician Lenny Kravitz, released by Virgin Records on May 10, 1993 as the second single from his third album, Are You Gonna Go My Way (1993). It is a rock ballad with string orchestration, and was co-written, arranged and produced by Kravitz, with Henry Hirsch also contributing to the orchestration and composition. Its lyrics concern one being able to achieve freedom and "eternal grace" if they believe in themselves and put their faith in God.

"Believe" was the first song from the album to be issued as a commercial single and to chart in the US, where it reached number 60 on the Billboard Hot 100. It found bigger success internationally, reaching number one in Iceland and the top 10 in Australia, Canada and New Zealand.

Critical reception
Like much of Kravitz's previous material and the Are You Gonna Go My Way album, critics noted its musical influences, with Scott Poulson-Bryant of Rolling Stone pointing out the similarity between its "string-laden" coda and that of the 1971 song "Layla" by Derek and the Dominos. Larry Flick from Billboard felt the track "makes easy switches between styles, from swaying pop ballad to treated psychedelia, and it builds to a grand finish." Writing for the Chicago Tribune, Patrick Kampert compared its sound, along with that of album track "Just Be a Woman", to the works of the Beatles. In his weekly UK chart commentary, James Masterton wrote that "the Beatlesque "Believe" [is] tipping a nod in the direction of "I am the Walrus" coupled with an anthemic chorus". Pan-European magazine Music & Media noted, "Church bells ring in the outro... Kravitz sees the light on the finest track off his current album. With this soulful ballad, he'll be the messiah for many formats."

In retrospective reviews of the album, Renowned for Sound said the track "still sounds relevant today", calling it an "uplifting rock ballad" and acclaiming its "impressive vocals and violin filled chorus [that is] very pleasant to the ear". Reviewing the album's deluxe edition for The Morton Report, Chaz Lipp called it a "rock radio hit" and "one of the biggest production numbers, with lush orchestration and phased lead vocals. It's a soaring, inspirational gem."

Music video
The accompanying music video for "Believe" was directed by French director Michel Gondry, with visual effects contributed by the French company BUF Compagnie. It is an homage to Stanley Kubrick's 1968 science fiction film 2001: A Space Odyssey, with the Deutsches Filminstitut calling it "pretty close" to the look of the original film. "Believe" was later published on YouTube in May 2011, and had generated more than 6.6 million views as of September 2021.

Track listing

Credits and personnel
Credits adapted from album liner notes.

 Lenny Kravitz – lead and background vocals, bass guitar, drums, production
 Henry Hirsch – Wurlitzer, engineering, mixing
 Craig Ross – acoustic and electric guitar
 Michael Hunter – French horn
 Eric Delente – violin
 Soye Kim – violin
 Robert Lawrence – violin
 Sarah Adams – viola
 Liuh-Wen Ting – viola
 Allen Whear – cello
 Frank Murphy – cello
 Carolyn Davies Fryer – double bass

Charts

Weekly charts

Year-end charts

Certifications

References

1990s ballads
1993 singles
1993 songs
Lenny Kravitz songs
Music videos directed by Michel Gondry
Number-one singles in Iceland
Rock ballads